Catarina Fagundes (born 8 April 1977 in Funchal, Madeira) is a Portuguese sailor. She competed in the Mistral Windsurf Class at the 1996 Summer Olympics in Atlanta, Georgia, and achieved the 21st position. She was the first Portuguese female athlete to enter an Olympic event in a sailing class.

Graduated by University of Aveiro for Tourism Planning and Management.

At present she is a business entrepreneur, ornithologist and windsurfing coach in Madeira, Portugal. CEO of Wind Birds.

References

External links
 
 
 
 

1977 births
Living people
Portuguese windsurfers
Female windsurfers
Portuguese female sailors (sport)
Olympic sailors of Portugal
Sailors at the 1996 Summer Olympics – Mistral One Design
Sportspeople from Funchal
Portuguese chief executives
Portuguese women in business
21st-century Portuguese businesspeople
21st-century businesswomen